Mill Creek is a mountain stream in the Angeles National Forest of Los Angeles County, California, and a major tributary of Big Tujunga Creek. The Mill Creek valley provides a major part of the route of Angeles Forest Highway (County Road N3). Mill Creek Summit, is the highest point along the road.

The named tributaries of Mill Creek, from upstream to downstream, are Monte Cristo Creek, Middle Fork Mill Creek, and North Fork Mill Creek.

See also
List of rivers of California

References

Rivers of Los Angeles County, California